Super Bowl LVI was an American football game played to determine the champion of the National Football League (NFL) for the 2021 season. The National Football Conference (NFC) champion Los Angeles Rams defeated the American Football Conference (AFC) champion Cincinnati Bengals, 23–20. The game was played on February 13, 2022, at SoFi Stadium in Inglewood, California, the home stadium of the Rams, marking the second consecutive and second overall Super Bowl with a team playing and winning in its home stadium.

The Rams' victory was their second, first as a Los Angeles-based team, and first since winning 1999's Super Bowl XXXIV when they were based in St. Louis. Finishing with a 12–5 record, the Rams reached their fifth appearance after acquiring veteran quarterback Matthew Stafford, who had not won a playoff game in his previous 12 years with the Detroit Lions. The Bengals, who finished with a 10–7 record, were seeking their first Super Bowl title following several decades of losing seasons and playoff struggles. They won their first playoff game since 1990, ending the longest drought in the four major North American sports, en route to their third Super Bowl appearance and first since 1988's Super Bowl XXIII.

The game had three lead changes and mostly kept within a one-possession margin. Los Angeles led 13–10 at halftime, but the Bengals scored 10 straight points on their first two drives in the third quarter. Trailing 20–16 in the fourth, the Rams scored a touchdown to retake the lead with under two minutes remaining and stopped Cincinnati's final drive on downs. Wide receiver Cooper Kupp, who converted a fourth down on the Rams' final drive, caught eight passes for 92 yards, and scored two touchdowns including the game-winning touchdown, was named Super Bowl MVP.

NBC's broadcast of Super Bowl LVI was the second-most watched in the game's history, marking a shift from several years of declining ratings. Seen by an average of 112.3 million total viewers on both NBC and its streaming platforms, the game's ratings were up 8% from the previous Super Bowl.

Background

Host selection process

In contrast to most previous Super Bowls, no bids were accepted for Super Bowl LVI. The bids for Super Bowl LIII, Super Bowl LIV and Super Bowl LV were all drawn from the same pool of candidates in a meeting on May 24, 2016. Atlanta, Miami, Los Angeles and Tampa Bay were the four candidates for the three contests; Atlanta received Super Bowl LIII, Miami received Super Bowl LIV and Los Angeles (which declined to bid on Super Bowl LIV and was not eligible for Super Bowl LIII) was granted Super Bowl LV.

On May 18, 2017, authorities announced that the opening of Los Angeles's new stadium, SoFi Stadium, originally scheduled for the start of the 2019 season, had been delayed a year to 2020. As a result, at the league's owners meetings in Chicago on May 23, 2017, the league re-awarded Super Bowl LV to the lone remaining candidate, Tampa Bay, and awarded Super Bowl LVI to Los Angeles.

The official logo for the game was unveiled on February 9, 2021, maintaining the standard design used since Super Bowl LI, but introducing sunset-themed designs reflecting the landscape of the host city/nearby area (featuring in this case palm trees) within the traditional Roman numerals.

Impact of the COVID-19 pandemic

In early January 2022, it was reported that AT&T Stadium in Arlington, Texas, was being considered as an alternate site for the game as a contingency plan due to an increase of COVID-19 infections in California attributed to the Omicron variant. The stadium last hosted Super Bowl XLV in 2011. However, the NFL later confirmed on January 13 that the game would remain at SoFi Stadium.

Attendance at the game was not limited, unlike Super Bowl LV in 2021, which was played with an audience at 37% of the capacity. Fans who went to the Super Bowl festivities prior to the game and those who attended the Super Bowl received a free KN95 mask. Per Los Angeles County public health orders, those attending the game were required to show proof of vaccination, a negative PCR test that was taken within 48 hours, or a negative antigen test that was taken within 24 hours. The proof of vaccination requirement had been implemented for large outdoor events in Los Angeles County since October 2021.

Those requesting media accreditation for the Super Bowl and playoffs were required to be fully vaccinated and have received at least one booster dose of vaccine.

Teams

Los Angeles Rams

The Los Angeles Rams finished the 2021 season with a  record under fifth-year head coach Sean McVay. This was their fifth Super Bowl appearance, third as a Los Angeles-based team, and second under McVay. The franchise held a 1–3 Super Bowl record prior to the game, winning Super Bowl XXXIV in 1999 as the St. Louis Rams. They also won two pre-Super Bowl era championships in 1945 as the Cleveland Rams and 1951 during their first stint in Los Angeles.

After the Rams lost 2018's Super Bowl LIII, quarterback Jared Goff suffered a decline in production, which led to tension between Goff and McVay. Ahead of the 2021 season, the Rams traded Goff, two first-round picks, and a third-round pick to the Detroit Lions in exchange for 12-year veteran quarterback Matthew Stafford. Selected first overall by the Lions in the 2009 NFL Draft, Stafford held an 0–3 playoff record, but ranked in the top 20 of major passing categories and was considered more suited to Los Angeles' offense. The team made another significant acquisition midway through the season when they traded a second- and third-round draft pick to the Denver Broncos for eight-time Pro Bowl linebacker Von Miller. A few weeks later, they signed free agent wide receiver Odell Beckham Jr., a three-time Pro Bowl selection, after he was released by the Cleveland Browns.

The Rams offense ranked ninth in yards (6,325) and tied with the Bengals for eighth in points scored (460). Stafford had career highs in touchdowns (41) and completion percentage (67.2), although he led the league in interceptions (17). He also set franchise records for single-season pass completions (404) and passing yards (4,886), while tying the passing touchdowns record. Wide receiver Cooper Kupp became the fourth NFL player and first since 2005 to obtain the receiving triple crown by leading the league in receptions (145), receiving yards (1,947), and receiving touchdowns (16). The Offensive Player of the Year, his receiving yards and receptions were both the second-most in a season. Kupp was joined by wide receiver Van Jefferson, who had 802 receiving yards and 6 touchdowns, and tight end Tyler Higbee, who had 560 receiving yards. Beckham added 537 yards and 5 touchdowns, helping fill the absence of the injured Robert Woods. The team's leading rusher at 845 yards was running back Sony Michel, who was acquired in a trade with the New England Patriots after Cam Akers missed most of the regular season with an Achilles tendon injury. Akers returned to the active roster ahead of the playoffs. Running back Darrell Henderson added 688 rushing yards until he suffered a season-ending injury in Week 16. The Rams' offensive line was led by 16-year veteran tackle Andrew Whitworth, who spent his first 11 seasons with the Bengals.

Defensively, the Rams ranked 17th in yards allowed (5,863) and 15th in points allowed (372). Named to the Pro Bowl were defensive tackle Aaron Donald (eighth selection), who led the team in sacks (12.5), and cornerback Jalen Ramsey (fifth selection), whose 4 interceptions were tied with safety Taylor Rapp for the most on the team. Linebacker Leonard Floyd complemented Donald with 9.5 sacks and Miller had 5 sacks after joining the team. The safety tandem of Rapp (64 solo tackles, 94 total) and Jordan Fuller (63 solo tackles, 113 total) had the most solo and combined tackles for the Rams, respectively. After an injury in the regular season finale forced Fuller to miss the playoffs, Los Angeles signed six-time Pro Bowl safety Eric Weddle out of retirement, who last played for the Rams in 2019. On special teams, placekicker Matt Gay earned Pro Bowl honors after leading the league in field goal percentage (94.1).

Cincinnati Bengals

The Cincinnati Bengals finished the season with a  record under third-year head coach Zac Taylor.
This was their third Super Bowl appearance, following 1981's Super Bowl XVI and 1988's Super Bowl XXIII. After losing both, the Bengals saw little success and had not won a playoff game since the 1990 season, which was the longest active drought in the four major North American sports.

Entering the 2021 season, the Bengals were considered unlikely to make the Super Bowl. They finished the previous three seasons at the bottom of the AFC North and had not made the playoffs since 2015. Cincinnati was also only two years removed from a league-worst 2–14 record during Taylor's first season. This finish granted the Bengals the first overall pick of the 2020 NFL Draft, which they used to select Heisman Trophy-winning quarterback Joe Burrow. Burrow posted strong numbers as a rookie, but won only two games before his season was cut short by a knee injury. In the following year's draft, Cincinnati used the fifth overall pick on wide receiver Ja'Marr Chase, who was Burrow's teammate at LSU. The team also drafted placekicker Evan McPherson in the fifth round. On defense, the Bengals signed free agent defensive end Trey Hendrickson, who was coming off a breakout season with the New Orleans Saints. Defensive tackles Larry Ogunjobi and B. J. Hill were also acquired through free agency and a trade with the New York Giants, respectively.

The reunion of Burrow and Chase brought success to the Bengals, whose offense went from 29th in yards (5,116) and points scored (311) the previous season to 13th in yards (6,145) and eighth (tied with the Rams) in points scored (460). In his first full season, Burrow led the league in completion percentage (70.4) and average yards per attempt (8.9), despite also leading the league in sacks taken (51). He set the season franchise records for passing yards (4,611) and touchdowns (34), along with the franchise record for single-game passing yards (525), and was named Comeback Player of the Year. Chase was fourth in receiving yards (1,455) and third in receiving touchdowns (13), both of which led the AFC. The Offensive Rookie of the Year, his receiving yards were the most for a rookie in the Super Bowl era and he set the rookie record for receiving yards in a game (266). Complementing Chase was wide receiver Tee Higgins, who obtained 1,081 receiving yards, making the Bengals one of only five teams with two 1,000 yard-receivers. Wide receiver Tyler Boyd further bolstered the receiving corps with 828 receiving yards and 5 touchdowns. Tight end C. J. Uzomah, who missed most of the previous year with a torn Achilles, had a breakout season by setting career highs in receiving yards (493) and touchdowns (5). Pro Bowl running back Joe Mixon was third in the NFL in rushing yards (1,205) and fourth in rushing touchdowns (13), while also recording 314 receiving yards and 3 receiving touchdowns.

Cincinnati's defense was 18th in yards allowed (5,964) and 17th in points allowed (376). Hendrickson ranked fifth in sacks (14), earning him his first Pro Bowl selection. Rounding out the defensive line, Hill had 5.5 sacks and 50 combined tackles, Ogunjobi had 7 sacks and 49 combined tackles, and defensive end Sam Hubbard had 7.5 sacks and 62 combined tackles. Linebacker Logan Wilson led the team in interceptions (4) and combined tackles (100), while safety Jessie Bates had the most solo tackles (62). McPherson, who was named to the 2021 PFWA All-Rookie Team, set the franchise records for the most 50-yard field goals converted in a season (9) and the longest field goal converted (58).

Playoffs

The Rams won their Wild Card matchup against the NFC West rival Arizona Cardinals in a 34–11 rout, marking the first career postseason win for Stafford. In the Divisional Round, the Rams took a 27–3 lead against the defending Super Bowl LV champion Tampa Bay Buccaneers, but committed a series of fumbles that led to the Buccaneers tying the game with 42 seconds remaining. Nevertheless, Stafford drove the Rams 63 yards off two passes to Kupp, which allowed Gay to kick the game-winning field goal as time expired. The NFC Championship Game pitted the Rams against the NFC West rival San Francisco 49ers, who swept them in the regular season and held a 6–0 record in games with quarterback Jimmy Garoppolo. Los Angeles trailed 17–7 entering the fourth quarter, but scored 13 consecutive points to take the lead with under two minutes remaining. The rally was marked by San Francisco committing several miscues, including 49ers safety Jaquiski Tartt dropping a potential interception. On the 49ers' final drive, Donald forced a pass from Garoppolo that was intercepted by linebacker Travin Howard to secure the 20–17 victory. Higbee suffered a knee injury during the game that forced him to miss the Super Bowl.

The Bengals defeated the Las Vegas Raiders 26–19 in the Wild Card Round for their first playoff victory since 1990, ending the longest drought in the four major North American sports. However, Ogunjobi suffered a foot injury that ruled him out for the remainder of the postseason. Their victory also came with controversy when a touchdown pass from Burrow to Boyd appeared to be whistled dead by an official before Boyd caught the ball. Cincinnati defeated the top-seeded Tennessee Titans in the Divisional Round 19–16 off a last-second field goal by McPherson, which was the franchise's first away playoff win. The victory occurred despite Burrow being sacked nine times, tying Warren Moon's 1993 postseason record and making him the most-sacked quarterback to win a playoff game. McPherson also became the first kicker to convert four field goals in separate rounds of the same postseason. In the AFC Championship Game against the two-time defending AFC champion Kansas City Chiefs, Cincinnati fell into a 21–3 deficit during the first half, but rallied to take a 24–21 lead in the fourth quarter. The game went into overtime, in which safety Vonn Bell intercepted Chiefs quarterback Patrick Mahomes on the first drive and McPherson converted a 31-yard field goal to send the Bengals to their first Super Bowl since 1988. Cincinnati's 18-point comeback was tied with the 2006 Indianapolis Colts for the largest in a conference championship.

Pre-game notes

This was the first Super Bowl to be played on the second Sunday in February, following the adoption of a 17-game schedule in 2021. From the 2003 to 2020 seasons, all Super Bowls were played on the first Sunday in February.

The Rams became the first NFL team to have their home stadium host both a conference championship game and the Super Bowl in the same season. However, the Rams were the designated visiting team as the home team alternates between the two conferences annually. Nevertheless, they still used their home locker room. The Bengals used the home locker room of the Los Angeles Chargers, who share the stadium with the Rams. This was the Rams' second Super Bowl in their home market, along with 1979's Super Bowl XIV, which was played at the Rose Bowl in Pasadena, California.

As the designated home team, the Bengals chose to wear their home black jerseys with white pants. The Rams selected newly unveiled alternate white jerseys with yellow pants.

The Bengals were the third team to make the Super Bowl after having the league's worst record two years earlier, following the 1981 San Francisco 49ers and the 2003 Carolina Panthers.

With McVay at age 36 and Taylor at age 38, Super Bowl LVI featured the youngest pair of head coaches in Super Bowl history and was the first to have both under 40. They were the two youngest head coaches in the league during the 2021 season. Taylor served on the Rams coaching staff under McVay from 2017 to 2018 and was hired as Cincinnati's head coach after Super Bowl LIII. Whitworth, at age 40, was the first player in a Super Bowl to be older than both head coaches.

This was the first Super Bowl in which both starting quarterbacks held career losing records. It was also the second in which both were first overall selections in the NFL Draft, along with Super Bowl 50. Burrow reached the Super Bowl faster than any previous quarterback taken first overall by doing so in his second season.

Entertainment

Pre-game ceremonies
Country singer Mickey Guyton performed "The Star-Spangled Banner", making her the first black female country singer to perform the national anthem at the game. She was backed by several background singers. Jhené Aiko, accompanied by harpist Gracie Sprout, performed "America the Beautiful". Sandra Mae Frank performed both songs in American Sign Language alongside Guyton and Aiko, with full coverage of the ASL performance available on the NBC Sports app. Mary Mary, accompanied by the Youth Orchestra of Los Angeles, performed "Lift Every Voice and Sing". Electronic music producer Zedd served as DJ during pre-game warmups. The flyover was conducted by a 5-plane formation by the USAF Air Combat Command demonstration teams with an A-10 Thunderbolt II, an F-16 Fighting Falcon, an F-22 Raptor, and an F-35 Lightning II as well as a P-51 Mustang representing the Air Force Heritage Flight. Former tennis player Billie Jean King then participated in the coin toss ceremony, honoring the 50th anniversary of Title IX, the federal civil rights law prohibiting sex discrimination in education programs. Dwayne Johnson introduced both teams using his persona as The Rock from the WWE.

Halftime show

The halftime show was headlined by Dr. Dre, Snoop Dogg, Eminem, Mary J. Blige and Kendrick Lamar, and it was widely praised. Surprise appearances were made by 50 Cent and Anderson .Paak. Deaf rappers Sean Forbes and Warren Snipe performed in American Sign Language during the show; this was the first time that American Sign Language was used during a halftime show at the Super Bowl. Described as a "legends of hip hop" performance, evoking nostalgia and localizing the globally broadcast game to Southern California with Dre's performance, it was the third show in partnership with Jay Z's Roc Nation. Eminem kneeled after his set as a tribute to Colin Kaepernick. A rumor claimed that Eminem had been told by the NFL to stand up rather than kneel. However, an NFL spokesman told The New York Times that officials watched the taking the knee gesture "during rehearsals this week." A list in Rolling Stone by Rob Sheffield praised the performance as an "old-school West Coast rap history lesson" and ranked it as the fourth-best Super Bowl halftime show of all time, behind those by Beyoncé, U2, and Prince. He wrote that Kendrick Lamar deserved his own full-length performance.

Media coverage

United States
Super Bowl LVI was televised by NBC, as part of a one-time modification to the annual cycle among the three main broadcast television partners of the NFL. The game was broadcast in Spanish by NBC's sister network Telemundo, marking the first time that a dedicated Spanish-language telecast aired on broadcast television. The network employed additional goal line, sideline and end zone camera angles, and a new on-air graphics package. The broadcast featured a special introduction starring actress Halle Berry.

Under the normal cycle the game would have been televised by CBS. However, in order to avoid counterprogramming the 2022 Winter Olympics in Beijing—which are televised exclusively by NBC—the NFL announced on March 13, 2019, that NBC had agreed to swap 2021's Super Bowl LV to CBS in exchange for Super Bowl LVI. Such a swap out of the normal rotation was done before when CBS was given Super Bowl XXVI in January 1992 after it acquired the rights to the 1992 Winter Olympics (which started 13 days later), and NBC then aired Super Bowl XXVII and Super Bowl XXVIII in the next two consecutive years. NBC also aired Super Bowl LII in February 2018, under the normal Super Bowl cycle, a few days before it began its coverage of the 2018 Winter Olympics. In all the other previous Winter Olympics years, the league stuck to the normal broadcast cycle regardless of which network was broadcasting the Olympics. However, Super Bowl LVI was the first Super Bowl to actually occur when the Winter Olympics were already underway: primetime coverage of the Olympics would have had to compete with the Super Bowl—diluting viewership and advertising revenue for CBS and NBC, and there is an unsaid gentleman's agreement between the NFL's broadcasters to not air competing original programming against the Super Bowl. This swap gave NBC the rights to both events and the network planned to maximize the advertising revenue from both events (as it did for Super Bowl LII prior to the 2018 Olympics). NBC subsequently announced in November 2021 that a block of primetime coverage for the Winter Olympics would air after Super Bowl LVI in lieu of new entertainment programming. The network promoted the events under the title "Super Gold Sunday".

NBC constructed an outdoor stage on the lake in Hollywood Park outside the stadium, from which it broadcast studio programming and other sporting events being held over Super Bowl week. This served for both cross-promotional reasons, and due to the availability of NBC Sports' headquarters in Stamford, Connecticut being constrained by the Olympics. As Mike Tirico was the studio host for both the NFL and the Olympics, he traveled back from Beijing part-way through the Games' opening week, and briefly hosted its primetime coverage from Stamford (using a redecorated version of the Football Night in America set) before flying out to Los Angeles for Super Bowl weekend. Tirico then presented the Games' primetime coverage from the lakeside set, before returning to Stamford after the Super Bowl. Alongside NBC's presences in and around SoFi Stadium, Telemundo originated a pre-game show from Plaza México in Lynwood to showcase California's Latino community.

NBC's broadcast featured Al Michaels as the lead broadcaster with Cris Collinsworth as the analyst. Michele Tafoya reported from the Rams' sideline with Kathryn Tappen reporting from the Bengals’ sideline. This was Michaels' eleventh Super Bowl as a broadcaster, tying him with Pat Summerall for the most Super Bowls on television play-by-play. Collinsworth worked his fifth Super Bowl as an analyst, and his fourth since replacing John Madden as lead analyst. This would be the final game at NBC for both Michaels and Tafoya; following the game, Tafoya announced that she would be leaving her position to pursue other interests outside of sports broadcasting, and Amazon Prime Video announced that Michaels would move to Thursday Night Football in the 2022 season. 

This was the final game under the NFL's deal with Verizon (following the game NFL+ would be required to watch local games beginning in the 2022 season), as the game was also available on the NFL mobile app and the Yahoo! Sports mobile app for free. The game was available on NBCSports.com, the NBC Sports app, and Peacock Premium. As part of its partnerships with the league, Verizon offered "5G Multi-View" features for attendees at SoFi Stadium.

The nationwide radio coverage was carried by Westwood One Sports. Kevin Harlan was the play-by-play commentator with analysis from Kurt Warner. Laura Okmin, and Mike Golic were the sideline reporters for each team, and Gene Steratore served as the rules analyst for the broadcast. Scott Graham served as pregame and postgame host, with Willie McGinest as his co-host.

Advertising
NBC charged $6.5 million to $7 million for a 30-second commercial at Super Bowl LVI; CBS was paid $5.5 million the previous year for Super Bowl ads. Budweiser, Coca-Cola, Hyundai, and Pepsi were among the sponsors that returned after skipping the previous Super Bowl due to the economic impact of the COVID-19 pandemic. Universal Pictures, Paramount Pictures, HBO Max, Netflix, Disney, Sony Pictures, Warner Bros., Peacock, AMC+, and Amazon Prime Video promoted their upcoming films and series during the game. These included Jurassic World Dominion, Nope, Ambulance, The Lost City, Sonic the Hedgehog 2, Winning Time: The Rise of the Lakers Dynasty, The Adam Project, Doctor Strange in the Multiverse of Madness, Moon Knight, Uncharted, the DC Extended Universe's 2022 film slate, Bel-Air, Joe vs. Carole, and The Lord of the Rings: The Rings of Power.

The advertising during the game stood out for a high number of celebrity cameos and advertisements for futuristic technology, particularly for products like electric vehicles, virtual reality and cryptocurrency. There were many cryptocurrency-related ads drawing comparisons to dot-com commercials during Super Bowl XXXIV in 2000, leading some to refer to the game as the "Crypto Bowl". Critics echoed their reception of the halftime show performance said a number of ads prominently referenced media from the 1990s and 2000s, geared to evoke nostalgia among Generation X and Millennial audiences.

The Super Bowl Ad Meter survey conducted by USA Today was won by Rocket Mortgage for their ad featuring Anna Kendrick advertising a Barbie toy house while facing the grim realities of the modern housing and real estate market.

Ratings and viewership
The broadcast of Super Bowl LVI drew the second-largest Super Bowl audience in history, tied with Super Bowl 50, reversing several years of decline with a total of 112.3 million viewers. About 101.1 million viewers watched Super Bowl LVI on linear television in the United States, representing an 8% increase from the previous year's game. The broadcast on NBC had 99.2 million viewers and 1.9 million viewed the Spanish-language Telemundo broadcast which was the first Spanish-language broadcast to carry the Super Bowl. According to NBC, it was the largest audience in U.S. Spanish-language history.

In addition to television ratings, 11.2 million viewers watched via streaming services (including co-viewing from connected devices), nearly doubling the record set by Super Bowl LV the year before which had 5.7 million viewers via streaming.

While viewership was up household ratings were nearly at an all-time low. The game's overall rating of 36.9 was the lowest since Super Bowl III (36.0) and the third-lowest Super Bowl of all time.

International
 ESPN International carried the game in Andorra, Argentina, Aruba, Australia, The Bahamas, Barbados, Benin, Bermuda, Bolivia, Bonaire, Botswana, Brazil, British Virgin Islands, Burkina Faso, Burundi, Cameroon, Cape Verde, Cayman Islands, Central African Republic, Chad, Chile, Colombia, Comoros, Democratic Republic of the Congo, Cook Islands, Costa Rica, Curacao, Djibouti, Ecuador, El Salvador, Equatorial Guinea, Eritrea, Eswatini, Ethiopia, Falkland Islands, Federated States of Micronesia, Fiji, French Guiana, French Polynesia, Gabon, The Gambia, Georgia, Ghana, Grenada, Guadeloupe, Guinea, Guinea Bissau, Haiti, Ivory Coast, Jamaica, Kenya, Kiribati, Lesotho, Liberia, Madagascar, Malawi, Mali, Marshall Islands, Mauritius, Mayotte, Micronesia, Montserrat, Mozambique, Namibia, Netherlands, New Zealand, Nigeria, Niue, Palau, Panama, Papua New Guinea, Paraguay, Peru, Rwanda, Samoa, São Tomé and Príncipe, Senegal, Seychelles, Sierra Leone, Somalia, South Africa, South Sudan, St. Helena, St. Kitts and Nevis, St. Lucia, St. Maarten, Sudan, Tanzania, Togo, Tokelau, Tonga, Trinidad & Tobago, Tunisia, Tuvalu, Uganda, Uruguay, Venezuela,  Zambia, and Zimbabwe.
 In Canada, CTV and TSN televised this game in English and RDS in French. As with most past editions (except from 2017 to 2019), CTV was permitted to invoke simultaneous substitution over NBC's affiliate stations available on Canadian TV providers. It was also on TSN Radio.
 In the United Kingdom and Republic of Ireland, the game was televised on the free-to-air network BBC One and paid-subscription networks Sky Sports Main Event and NFL (as well as its sister channel Sky Showcase) (Sky is part of Comcast, owner of US broadcast holder NBC). It was carried on radio via BBC Radio 5 Live and talkSPORT.
 In Australia, the game was televised by the Seven Network as well as its sister channel 7mate and on demand platform 7plus. The game was also broadcast on Melbourne Radio station 1116 SEN the game was commentated by Gerard Whateley and Ben Graham.
 In Turkey, the game was televised by S Sport.
 In Latin America, the game was televised on ESPN and on the streaming service Star+.
 In France, the game was televised on beIN Sports and on La Chaîne L'Équipe.
 In Germany, the game was broadcast free-to-air on ProSieben, ran and Joyn. The subscription video streaming service DAZN broadcasts the game on its platform.
 In Austria, the game was broadcast free-to-air on Puls 4 and on the German channels above who are all broadcast in Austria too.
 In Italy, Free-to-air channel Rai 1 and streaming platform DAZN televised the game.
 In Mexico, the game was televised on Televisa's Canal 5, TUDN and TV Azteca's Azteca 7.
 In Brazil, the game was televised on RedeTV!, ESPN and on the streaming service Star+.
 In Russia, Ukraine and the CIS, the game was televised on Viasat Sport.
 In Belgium and Portugal, the game was televised on paid-subscription channel Eleven Sports.
 In Spain, the game was broadcast by Movistar+ and televised on #Vamos por M+.
 In the Philippines, the game was televised on TapDMV.
 In the Balkans, the game was televised on Sport Klub.
 In Japan, the game was televised on DAZN and on Nippon TV.
 Indonesian streaming service Mola broadcast the game in Indonesia, Timor Leste, Malaysia and Singapore.
 In Denmark, the game was broadcast on TV3 Sport.
 In Poland, the game was televised on TVP Sport.
 In Puerto Rico, the game was carried live on Telemundo Puerto Rico in Spanish and on NBC Puerto Rico in English.

Game summary

First half

The Bengals won the coin toss and deferred to the second half; the Rams received the ball at the kickoff. Cincinnati's Trey Hendrickson sacked Matthew Stafford, leading to a punt by Los Angeles. The Bengals drove towards midfield, but were stalled on fourth down, when Ernest Jones knocked down Joe Burrow's pass to Ja'Marr Chase. Los Angeles took over at their own 49-yard-line. A 3rd-and-4 was converted with a 20-yard completion from Stafford to Cooper Kupp and the Rams got into the red zone on the next play with a 4-yard Henderson rush. Two plays later, the game's first score came by way of a 17-yard touchdown pass from Stafford to Odell Beckham Jr. Unable to respond immediately, the Bengals went three-and-out, and Kevin Huber's punt was downed at the Los Angeles 28-yard-line. The Rams were similarly unproductive on their next drive, as a delay of game penalty erased a five-yard gain on first down and a catch by Van Jefferson on third down was short of a first down. Hekker's punt was returned to the Cincinnati 30-yard-line, where the Bengals started their next series. On the drive's second play, a 46-yard pass from Burrow to Chase advanced the ball to the Los Angeles 11-yard-line, though three straight incomplete passes forced a 29-yard field goal attempt, which was converted by Evan McPherson, making the score 7–3 Rams. After a touchback, the Rams got the ball on their own 25-yard-line; they ran one play, an Akers rush for a loss of one yard, before the first quarter ended.

The Rams started the second quarter facing 2nd-and-11 on their own 24-yard-line. An unsuccessful deep pass from Stafford to Kupp was immediately followed by a 35-yard pass to Beckham and a 25-yard pass to Henderson. Now inside the red zone at the Cincinnati 16-yard-line, Henderson rushed for five yards before Stafford passed to Kupp for an 11-yard touchdown. The extra point was unsuccessful as Hekker mishandled the snap, then threw an interception to Germaine Pratt, keeping the Rams lead at 13–3. The ensuing kickoff was a touchback and the Bengals advanced the ball 75 yards in 14 plays, with Burrow completing 5/5 passes for 38 yards while Joe Mixon rushed 6 times for 26 yards. On the last play, Mixon took a pitch from Burrow and then passed to Tee Higgins with a halfback pass for a 6-yard-touchdown. Another touchback followed and the Rams began their drive with a pair of plays totaling 19 yards, which got them to their own 44-yard-line. After a knee injury to Beckham Jr., which sidelined him for the rest of the game, a false start penalty backed them up five yards. The drive ended on 3rd-and-14 at the Bengals' 43-yard-line, when Stafford's pass downfield was intercepted Jessie Bates in the end zone for a touchback. The Bengals got possession at their own 10-yard-line (backed up ten yards as the result of an unsportsmanlike conduct penalty). The short drive was unsuccessful and they punted with 42 seconds remaining. The Rams responded with a drive that was even shorter, as they went three-and-out in 26 seconds and punted back to Cincinnati; Burrow then took a knee to end the half.

Second half

Cincinnati had their first lead of the game on the first play of the second half, when Burrow threw a deep pass to Higgins on near the left sideline, who was tangled up with defensive back Jalen Ramsey. Ramsey fell down just before Higgins caught a pass, leaving him wide open. Higgins ran to the end zone scoring a 75-yard touchdown. Replays showed Higgins grabbing Ramsey's facemask before the catch, but no penalty flag was thrown and the touchdown stood, giving the Bengals a 17–13 lead. Things got worse for the Rams, as Stafford threw a pass that bounced off the hand of receiver Ben Skowronek and was intercepted at the Rams' 32-yard-line by Chidobe Awuzie. Cincinnati was able to capitalize with a 38-yard field goal made by McPherson, after being pushed back nine yards by a sack by Aaron Donald on the previous play. Now leading by seven points, the Bengals kicked off for a touchback. Shortly into the drive, the Rams faced a 3rd-and-8, which they converted for 15 yards with a pass from Stafford to Henderson. Overall, the drive covered 11 plays and 52 yards, with Stafford completing 4/5 passes for 44 yards before Matt Gay's 41-yard field goal made the score 20–16 with 6:02 left in the third quarter. Four consecutive three-and-outs followed, with the Bengals punting with 43 seconds remaining in the quarter and the Rams running a single play, a five-yard Akers rush to the Cincinnati 47-yard-line, before the third quarter came to an end.

The Rams punted three plays into the fourth quarter, giving the Bengals the ball at their own 16-yard-line. A 16-yard pass from Burrow to Boyd on second down went for a 16-yard gain, but from there the Cincinnati offense stalled and an unnecessary roughness penalty on third down forced a punt on 4th-and-29, which was returned to the Los Angeles 35-yard-line. The Rams punted the ball back after another three-and-out of their own, and Cincinnati took over after the punt went out of bounds at their 16-yard-line. A 12-yard rush by Mixon gained a first down on the drive's first play and a 3-yard pass from Burrow to Chris Evans then gained another first down on 3rd-and-2; however, Cincinnati was not able to gain another first down and punted three plays later on 4th-and-9. Receiving the ball on their own 21-yard-line, the Rams found themselves facing 4th-and-1 just four plays into the drive, but a 7-yard rush by Kupp on an end-around converted it for a first down. They reached Bengals' territory three plays later. A 22-yard pass from Stafford to Kupp a few plays afterwards got them to the Bengals' 24-yard-line and they reached the red zone with another Stafford to Kupp pass, this for 8 yards. After the two-minute warning, three incomplete passes followed, but a holding penalty on linebacker Logan Wilson gave the Rams a first down. After the next play (a touchdown cancelled by offsetting penalties against both teams), Bengals' defensive back Eli Apple was flagged for pass interference in the end zone, bringing up first and goal from the 1. Two plays later, Stafford threw a 1-yard touchdown pass to Kupp, giving the Rams a 23–20 lead with 1:25 left on the clock. The Bengals got the ball back at their own 25-yard-line and quickly gained 26 yards on a 17-yard pass to Chase and a 9-yard catch by Boyd, respectively. After an incomplete pass, Donald and fellow lineman Greg Gaines tackled Samaje Perine for no gain, bringing up 4th-and-1. The Bengals decided to pass the ball for a first down, but Donald wrapped Burrow up before he could make the throw. He still managed to attempt a pass to Perine as he was being taken down, but the ball fell short, causing a turnover on downs and enabling Los Angeles to run out the rest of the clock with a quarterback kneel. Kupp was named the Super Bowl MVP, with eight receptions for 92 yards and two touchdowns, including three receptions and a touchdown (as well as one carry for seven yards) on the Rams final drive.

Box score

Final statistics

Statistical comparison

Individual statistics

Completions/attemptsCarriesLong gainReceptionsTimes targeted

Starting lineups

Officials
Super Bowl LVI featured seven officials. Continuing a practice instituted the previous year an alternate official was assigned for each position of an official on the field and the replay official. The numbers in parentheses below indicate their uniform numbers.

 Referee: Ronald Torbert (62), first Super Bowl
 Umpire: Bryan Neale (92), first Super Bowl
 Down judge: Derick Bowers (74), second Super Bowl (XLIII)
 Line judge: Carl Johnson (101), third Super Bowl (XLII, LIV)
 Field judge: Rick Patterson (15), third Super Bowl (XXXVII, XXXIX, both as side judge)
 Side judge: Keith Washington (7), first Super Bowl
 Back judge: Scott Helverson (93), third Super Bowl (XLII, XLV)
 Replay official: Roddy Ames, first Super Bowl
 Replay assistant: Sean McKee
 Alternate officials:
 Referee: Bill Vinovich (52)
 Umpire: Paul King (121)
 Down judge: Ed Camp (134)
 Line judge: Greg Bradley (98)
 Field judge: Aaron Santi (50)
 Side judge: Jonah Monroe (120)
 Back judge: Greg Steed (12)
 Replay official: Mark Butterworth

Aftermath
The 2022 Rams finished 5–12, setting the records for the most losses, lowest winning percentage (.294), and longest losing streak (six games) for a defending Super Bowl champion. They were also the first defending Super Bowl champion to miss the playoffs since the 2016 Denver Broncos and first to have a losing record since the 2003 Tampa Bay Buccaneers.

The 2022 Bengals tied their franchise-best 12–4 record. For the first time in franchise history, they clinched a consecutive division title and won a playoff game in consecutive seasons. However, they lost to the eventual Super Bowl LVII champion Kansas City Chiefs in the AFC Championship Game.

References

External links

Super Bowl
Events in Inglewood, California
2021 National Football League season
2022 in American football
2022 in American television
2022 in sports in California
Cincinnati Bengals postseason
Los Angeles Rams postseason
Sports competitions in Inglewood, California
American football in Inglewood, California
February 2022 sports events in the United States